The Pennsylvania Amateur Golf Championship is an annual golf tournament in the American state of Pennsylvania.

Jay Sigel won the event a record 11 times.

Winners

Source:

References 

Amateur golf tournaments in the United States
Golf in Pennsylvania
Sports competitions in Pennsylvania
1909 establishments in Pennsylvania
Recurring sporting events established in 1909